TIC 168789840 is a stellar system with six stars.  Three pairs of binary stars circle a common barycenter. While other systems with three pairs of stars have been discovered, this was the first system where the stars can be observed eclipsing one another, as their planes of rotation point approximately towards the Earth.

Discovery 

The Transiting Exoplanet Survey Satellite identified that the star system consisted of six eclipsing stars. The discovery was announced in January 2021. To be seen the group needs strong magnification from Earth as is much fainter than red clump giant star Theemin and is about nine times further away.

Orbits 

Two sets of the binaries co-orbit relatively closely, while the third pair of stars takes 2,000 years to orbit the entire system barycenter. The inner A pair and C pair orbit each other in 3.7 years.

According to Jeanette Kazmierczak of NASA's Goddard Space Flight Center:

Stellar characteristics
The primary stars of all three close binaries are slightly hotter and brighter than the Sun, while the secondary stars are much cooler and dimmer. Because the two closely bound pairs are so close, only the third, more distant pair could have planets. The primaries are all beginning to evolve away from the main sequence, while the less massive and longer-lived secondaries are all still firmly on the main sequence and fusing hydrogen in their cores.

See also
Castor (star) – the second-brightest (apparent) "star" in Gemini, likewise a (double-double)-double system

References

6
Astronomical objects discovered in 2021
Eridanus (constellation)
Eclipsing binaries